Yorath is a Welsh surname derived from Iorwerth. Notable people with the surname include:

 Christopher J. Yorath (1879–1932), commissioner of Saskatoon and city treasurer during World War I
 Terry Yorath, former British footballer and manager of Margate F.C.
 Gabby Logan (née Yorath), British television and radio sports presenter

See also
 Yorath Island, a small island in the South Saskatchewan River just outside the southern boundaries of the city of Saskatoon, Saskatchewan, Canada

Anglicised Welsh-language surnames